Mamola is a surname. Notable people with the surname include:

Dakota Mamola (born 1994), Belgian motorcycle racer
Randy Mamola (born 1959), American motorcycle racer